Nodesha (born Nodesha Felix; 1985 in San Bernardino, California) is an American R&B singer, who was signed to Arista Records when she was only sixteen years old. She released her debut album, Nodesha, in 2003. Her singles included "Get It While It's Hot" and "That's Crazy". Executive producers on the album were Jimmy Jam, Terry Lewis, and L.A. Reid. Nodesha co-wrote all of her songs.

Biography
In 2001 she auditioned for Flyte Tyme Records via Jimmy Jam and Terry Lewis. To receive their attention she started dancing on the table, which convinced them to give her a recording contract. Her debut single "Get It While It's Hot" was released in October 2003 on Arista Records. Whilst the majority of her debut album was produced by Jimmy Jam and Terry Lewis, other producers included Jermaine Dupri and Dallas Austin. The Japanese edition of the album includes two bonus tracks, "Shake 'Em" and "Rock Your Body", the latter of which was produced by Jermaine Dupri.

Discography

Albums
Nodesha (2003)

Singles

References

External links
Last.fm
Eil.com
TV.com
Discogs.com

1985 births
Living people
American contemporary R&B singers
Singers from California
21st-century American singers
21st-century American women singers